Monica Hellström (born 1975) is a Danish film producer.

Early life
Hellström graduated from the EAVE Producers Workshop in 2010, and holds an MA in Film from the University of Copenhagen and a BA in Film from the University of Bedfordshire.

Career
Hellström has worked as a producer at Upfront Films and The Danish Film Institute's Film Workshop. She was a producer at Final Cut for Real since 2010. A member of the Academy of Motion Picture Arts and Sciences, she was selected by European Film Promotion for Producer on the Move, Cannes 2020.

Hellström has produced or co-produced over 20 films, the notable ones being Daniel Dencik’s Moon Rider, Reel Talent Award winner at 2012's CPH:DOX, The Distant Barking of Dogs, that won over 30 awards including Best First Appearance Film at IDFA in 2017, Cille Hannibal and Christine Hanberg's He’s My Brother, Special Mention at CPH:DOX and Audience Award at DOK.fest München in 2021. She also served as co-producer among others of Tarik Saleh’s award-winning thriller The Nile Hilton Incident and Rebecca Daly’s Irish film Good Favour.

Hellström was nominated for two Academy Awards in 2022 in the categories Best Animated Feature and Best Documentary Feature, for the documentary film Flee. She was also awarded The Ib Award by the Danish Board of Film Directors in 2022.

Hellström started her own company Ström Pictures in May 2022.

Selected filmography 
 A House Made of Splinters (2022)
 He's My Brother (2021)
 Flee (2021; co-nominated with Jonas Poher Rasmussen, Signe Byrge Sørensen and Charlotte de la Gournerie for the Best Animated Feature and the Best Documentary Feature)
 Forget Me Not (2019; official selection, Nordic Dox, CPH:DOX 2019)
 The Distant Barking of Dogs (2017; Won best doc IDFA, First appearances 2017, Oscar shortlisted 2018, Peadoby Award, best doc 2020, European Film Award & Emmy nominated)
 The Dvor Massacre (2016)
 The Fencing Champion (2014)
 The Sumo Wrestler’s Son (2013)
 MoonRider (2012)
 The World’s Best Chef (2011)
Co-producer 
 Boy From Heaven (2022)  
 Little Girl (2020)  
 Good Favour (2017)  
 The Nile Hilton Incident (2017)  
 Concerning Violence (2014)  
 Ruth (2015)  
 Varicella (2015)   
 Dancing for You (2015)    
 Chapter 7 (2015)

References

External links 

Monica Hellström - DFI

1975 births
Living people
Place of birth missing (living people)
Danish producers
Danish film producers
Documentary film producers
Unit production managers